Southern Park Mall is a shopping mall in Boardman, Ohio, United States, serving the Youngstown–Warren metropolitan area. It was developed by the Edward J. DeBartolo Corporation in 1970, and is now owned by Washington Prime Group. Its anchor stores are JCPenney and Macy's, with junior anchors H&M and Planet Fitness.

History
The Southern Park Mall was named after the Southern Park Race Track; a historic horse racing facility that was located approximately 1.5 miles south of the mall's present position. The horse track was bounded by Washington Boulevard, Southern Boulevard, and McClurg Road. One of the only remaining structures, the Southern Park Stable, was added to the National Register of Historic Places on July 10, 1986.

Originally planned as a joint venture with fellow Youngstown-based developer William M. Cafaro, the DeBartolo Corporation bought out the Cafaro Company's interest in the project in 1968. The mall originally had three anchor stores and totaled . Sears opened October 13, 1969 along with the Sears wing that included junior anchor Woolworth.  JCPenney opened April 2, 1970 and the Youngstown-based Strouss opened April 8, 1970. JCPenney and Strouss relocated from DeBartolo's Greater Boardman Plaza, located approximately one mile west of Southern Park Mall.  Other initial stores included Gray Drugs, Kroger, and Southern Park Theater.

The Pittsburgh-based Joseph Horne Company began construction on a fourth anchor unit on July 25, 1972, and opened July 30, 1973. The Strouss store was changed into Kaufmann's in 1986 when The May Department Stores Company merged its divisions. Dillard's acquired Joseph Horne Company with Horne's closing July 17, 1992 and Dillard's opening August 12, 1992.  Dillard's bought their store and adjoining land on October 13, 1993.

In 1997 the mall went under an extensive renovation, shortly after the DeBartolo Corporation merged with Simon Property Group. Simon spent $19 million making improvements to the interiors, adding a food court and a Cinemark Tinseltown USA 7 movie theater at the southeastern edge of the mall's property. It opened in 1997 and has 7 screens. Jillian's, which replaced Woolworth, was a tenant from 1999 to 2011. In 2006, Kaufmann's was rebranded to Macy's following the latter's acquisition.

On April 3, 2014, news was released of the sale of Southern Park Mall by Simon Property Group to its spinoff, Washington Prime Group. On April 5, 2018, Sears announced that they would be closing their location at the mall in July 2018 after nearly 49 years. On February 13, 2019, it was announced that Dillard's would also be closing on May 14, 2019 which left JCPenney and Macy's as the only remaining anchors. On this same day, the Dillard's building was sold to a Cafaro Company subsidiary, Boardman SC LLC. In redevelopment efforts, Washington Prime Group tore down the Sears building in late 2019 and replaced it with the DeBartolo Commons, which added some smaller exterior storefronts whilst decreasing the overall square footage of the mall. DeBartolo Commons opened in 2021, adding recreational spaces and restaurants to the complex. Earlier in 2021, a Planet Fitness relocated to the mall, combining former tenant locations and creating a new junior anchor space on the mall's east side.

Anchor Stores
JCPenney  
Macy's  
H&M 
Planet Fitness

See also
 List of shopping malls in the United States

References

Washington Prime Group
Shopping malls in Ohio
Youngstown, Ohio
Buildings and structures in Mahoning County, Ohio
Tourist attractions in Mahoning County, Ohio
Shopping malls established in 1970